Czech Technical University in Prague (CTU) is one of the largest universities in the Czech Republic with 8 faculties, and is one of the oldest institutes of technology in Central Europe. It is also the oldest non-military technical university in Europe.

In the academic year 2020/21, Czech Technical University offered 130 degree programs in Czech and 84 in English. It was considered one of the top 10 universities in emerging Europe and Central Asia in the same year.

History 

It was established as the Institute of Engineering Education in 1707, but as a secondary education (high school) instead of a tertiary university, by Emperor Joseph I as a response to Christian Josef Willenberg's petition addressed to preceding emperor Leopold I. In 1806, the institute of Engineering Education was transformed into Prague Polytechnical Institute (or Prague Polytechnic), when the university studies began. After the disintegration of the Austro-Hungarian Empire, the name of the school was changed in 1920 to the Czech Technical University in Prague.

Origins 
In 1705,  asked Emperor Leopold I for permission to teach "the art of engineering". Later, the emperor's only son, who succeeded him on the throne in 1707 as Joseph I, ordered the Czech state of Prague to provide engineering education. For various reasons, the request was not implemented for some time. However, in October 1716, Willenberg repeated the request. Finally, on 9 November 1717, a decree by the Czech state granted Willenberg the first engineering professorship in Central Europe. On 7 January 1718, he began teaching.

Initially, Willenberg started teaching only 12 students in his own apartment (six barons, four knights, and two burghers), but gradually students proliferated (in 1779, there were around 200) and they started studying in more suitable premises. Initially, the training focused mainly on the military. Teaching in the first year lasted one hour per day; in the second year, almost two.

The successor of Prof. Willenberg was Johann Ferdinand Schor, builder of hydraulic structures in the basin of the Vltava and author of textbooks used at the school of mathematics. He began under Willenberg's leadership by teaching optics, perspectivity, technical drawing and geography. The third was professor František Antonín Herget, who mainly focused on civil engineering, particularly construction.

In September 1776, Maria Theresa allowed Herget to use the Clementinum building; in 1786, the school moved to the new and better building.

In 1787, the School of Engineering was established at the decree of Emperor Joseph II.

Academic profile

Rankings 
The CTU is the best technical university in the Czech Republic. In 2010, in the world rating of THES-QS universities in the category of technical sciences, the CTU took the 121st place, in the category of natural sciences – 246th place. In 2018, Czech Technical University was ranked as 220th in Engineering and Technology in the QS World University Rankings.

Admissions 
Students apply to faculty. Each faculty has different admissions requirements. Acceptance rate ranges from 52.32% (Faculty of Information Technology) to 81.51% (Faculty of Transportation Sciences). The percentage of international students grew from 2.5% in 2000 to 16.4% in 2017.

Graduation rate 
Due to the pace and difficulty of CTU coursework, high percentage of students fail to complete first year of their studies. First year failure rates range from 23% (Faculty of Civil Engineering) to 47% (Faculty of Information Technology). Overall, only 48% of enrolled undergraduate students end up graduating.

International cooperation

Study and work abroad 
CTU has international agreements with 484 foreign universities. Many of them are ranked in the first hundred in QS World University Rankings such as National University of Singapore, Nanyang Technological University, Purdue University, Korea Institute of Science and Technology (KAIST), Hong Kong University of Science and Technology, Technical University of Munich, Delft University of Technology or KU Leuven.

CTU has many bilateral agreements with universities outside of Europe. The most sought after universities are from Canada, Australia, Singapore, United States and Japan. That said, every year many students choose to study in attractive destinations such as Argentina, Brazil, China, Hong Kong, India, Indonesia, South Africa, South Korea, Costa Rica, Mexico, New Zealand, Peru, Russia or Taiwan.

CTU also participates in the European programmes Erasmus and Leonardo.

International students 
CTU has currently over 3500 international students from 117 countries. About 750 of them are an exchange students. One of the organizations that takes care of international students is International Student Club (ISC), which organizes Buddy Programme and extra-curricular activities.

Dual diploma 
CTU has currently 21 agreements with universities such as Technical University of Munich, RWTH Aachen or Trinity College Dublin.

Constituent parts 

CTU has 8 faculties. The oldest one (Faculty of Civil Engineering) was founded in 1707, while the youngest and most selective faculty (Faculty of Information Technology) was founded in 2009.

The university also has 5 university institutes, such as Czech Institute of Informatics, Robotics and Cybernetics, Klokner Institute, Institute of Physical Education and Sport, University Centre for Energy Efficient Buildings and Institute of Experimental and Applied Physics.

Other constituent parts include Computing and Information Centre, Technology and Innovation Centre, The Research Centre for Industrial Heritage, Centre for Radiochemistry and Radiation Chemistry, Division of Construction and Investment and Central Library.

The university also has a Publishing House and service facilities.

Student clubs within the CTU are integrated in the Student Union. It has 27 members and covers a wide range of free time activities, with the biggest club being Silicon Hill. The Student Union also organizes social events for students throughout the year.

Notable alumni 
 František Běhounek, radiologist
 Christian Doppler, mathematician and physicist
 Ivan Puluj, physicist and one of the founders of medical radiology
 Antonín Engel, architect
 Josef Gerstner, physicist and engineer
 Václav Havel, statesman, writer and former dissident, who served as the last President of Czechoslovakia
 Josef Hlávka, architect, main founder of Academy of Science, patron
 Otakar Husák, CTU graduate, chemist, General, Czechoslovak Legionnaire in Russia and France, fighter from Zborov and Terron, Chairman of President Masaryk's Military Office, Minister of Defence, First Director of the Explosia Semtín factory, prisoner of concentration camps Dachau and Buchenwald, Director of the Synthesia Semtín (1945–1948), political prisoner (Prague Nusle-Pankrác, Mírov 1950–1956)  
 Eva Jiřičná, architect
 Karel Jonáš, who became Charles Jonas (Wisconsin politician), Czech-American publisher, legislator and Lieutenant Governor of Wisconsin
 George Klir, computer and systems scientist
 Karl Kořistka, geographer and technologist
 František Křižík, inventor, electrical engineer and entrepreneur
 Ivo Lukačovič, entrepreneur, founder and chairman of Seznam.cz
 Vladimir Prelog, chemist and Nobel Prize winner
 Richard Rychtarik, set designer
Marie Schneiderová-Zubaníková first female Czech civil engineering graduate (in 1923)
 Emil Votoček, chemist
 Emil Weyr, mathematician
 Josef Zítek, architect and engineer

Gallery

Notes and references

External links 

 CTU official website in English
 CTU official website in Czech
 www.StudyAtCTU.com Official website for international students
 International Student Club Organization for international students
 IAESTE Organization for international students
 UCEEB University Centre for Energy Efficient Buildings (UCEEB)
 Top Industrial Managers for Europe (TIME) network for student mobility.

 
Universities in the Czech Republic
Technical universities and colleges
Educational institutions in Prague
1707 establishments in the Holy Roman Empire
1707 establishments in the Habsburg monarchy
18th-century establishments in Bohemia
Educational institutions established in 1707
Engineering universities and colleges in the Czech Republic